Kilmore East railway station is located on the North East line in Victoria, Australia. It serves the town of Kilmore East, and opened on 18 April 1872 as Kilmore. It was renamed Kilmore East on 1 October 1888.

The town of Kilmore is some distance to the west, at a much higher elevation, and was unable to be served directly by the main-line railway.

There is a disused goods shed at the station, as well as a staffed signal box. Approximately three kilometres in the down direction from the station is a siding which is used to load material from the Apex quarry.

History
The station opened as Kilmore on 18 April 1872, the railway having opened in the same year, as part of the North East line to Wodonga. When the branch line from Kilmore Junction to Heathcote opened in 1888, a new Kilmore station was provided closer to the town on the new line, and the original station was renamed Kilmore East.

A timber building was provided on the down platform (Platform 2) in 1878, to replace four temporary structures. A temporary refreshment room operated at the station in 1873, until the one at Seymour was opened. The present station building dates from 1939.

By 1878, a number of sidings for timber loading existed, and interlocking of the signals was provided in 1899. A new lever frame was installed in 1914, when more sidings were added.

In 1962, the Melbourne-Albury standard gauge line opened to the east of the station. In 1969, a crossover and connections to No. 3 and No. 4 roads, all located at the down end of the station, were abolished.

The former locomotive water tank at the station was dismantled on 7 April 1973. In 1979, No. 3 road was booked out of use.

The Apex quarry siding was opened three kilometres north of Kilmore East in 1976, but the majority of the other sidings had been removed by the late 1980s.

In 2008, construction began on a seven-kilometre-long "passing lane" on the parallel standard gauge line, as part of the Australian Rail Track Corporation's Melbourne-Sydney railway upgrade project. The passing lane extends from south of Kilmore East station towards Broadford.

Platforms and services
Kilmore East has two side platforms. It is served by V/Line Seymour and Shepparton line trains.

Platform 1:
 services to Southern Cross
 services to Southern Cross

Platform 2:
 services to Seymour
 services to Shepparton

Transport links
Mitchell Transit operates one bus route to and from Kilmore East station, under contract to Public Transport Victoria:
 Kilmore Town Service

References

External links
Victorian Railway Stations gallery

Railway stations in Australia opened in 1872
Regional railway stations in Victoria (Australia)
Shire of Mitchell